MTV Hits Weekly Hot30 Countdown is an Australian music television show that first aired on 5 December 2010. It broadcast on MTV Hits, Today Network radio stations and online each Sunday from 6:00pm–8:30pm.

Programme format 
MTV Hits Weekly Hot30 Countdown generally plays a top 30 countdown that consists of the latest national and international video clips. It also features interviews with both local and international artists. It broadcasts every Sunday for two hours and thirty minutes on channel MTV Hits, Today Network radio stations across Australia and also online at MTVhits.com.au and Hot30.com.

Presenters 
The presenters of the show include:
Erin McNaught (2010–current)
Matty Acton (2010–current)

See also

 List of Australian music television shows
 List of Australian television series

References 

MTV original programming
Australian music chart television shows
Television shows set in Australia
2010 Australian television series debuts
2013 Australian television series endings